Events from the year 1994 in the United Kingdom.

Incumbents
Monarch – Elizabeth II 
Prime Minister – John Major (Conservative)
Parliament – 51st

Events

January
 4 January – Following the expulsion of the British ambassador from Sudan, the Foreign Office orders the Sudanese ambassador to leave Britain.
 8 January – Jayne Torvill and Christopher Dean win the British ice-dancing championship at the Sheffield Arena.
 10 January – Two government ministers resign: Lord Caithness following the suicide of his wife, and Tim Yeo following the revelation that he fathered a child with Conservative councillor Julia Stent.
 14 January – The Duchess of Kent joins the Roman Catholic Church, the first member of the Royal Family to convert to Catholicism for more than 300 years.
 18 January – The Prince of Wales (now Charles III) retires from competitive polo at the age of 45.
 20 January
 Despite the continuing economic recovery and falling unemployment, the Conservative government is now 20 points behind Labour (who score at 48%) in the latest MORI poll.
 Sir Matt Busby, the legendary former Manchester United manager, dies aged 84.
 31 January – British Aerospace sells its 80% stake in Rover to BMW, leaving Britain without an independent volume carmaker. It is envisaged that the new Rover Group will produce more than 1 million cars per year worldwide and will be Europe's seventh largest carmaker.

February
 1 February – John Smith (Labour Party leader) strongly criticises the sale of the Rover Group, saying that it only satisfied British Aerospace's short-term need for cash. In contrast, Prime Minister John Major backs the takeover as giving the Rover Group excellent prospects for export markets and investment. 
 4 February – British Coal confirms the closure of four more pits, a move which will claim some 3,000 jobs.
 7 February – Stephen Milligan, Conservative MP for Eastleigh in Hampshire, is found dead at his home in Chiswick, West London. On 11 February it is announced that forensic tests have revealed that he died of asphyxiation and that his death was probably the result of an auto-erotic sex practice.
 10 February – Three men are jailed in connection with the IRA bombings of Warrington gasworks 11 months previous. Pairic MacFhloinn is jailed for 35 years, Denis Kinsella for 25 years and John Kinsella for 20 years.
 12–27 February – Great Britain and Northern Ireland compete at the 1994 Winter Olympics in Lillehammer, Norway, and win 2 bronze medals.
 21 February – Honda sells its 20% stake of the Rover Group, allowing BMW to take full control. This marks the end of the 13-year venture between the two carmakers, although the Honda-based Rover 400 will still go into production next year, becoming the seventh and final product of the venture.
 24 February – Police in Gloucester begin excavations at 25 Cromwell Street, the home of 52-year-old builder Fred West, investigating the disappearance of his daughter Heather, who was last seen alive in the summer of 1987 when she was 16 years old.
 28 February – Fred West is charged with the murder of his daughter Heather and of the murder of Shirley Robinson, an 18-year-old woman who was last seen alive in 1978.

March
 8, 10 and 13 March – The IRA launch three successive mortar attacks on Heathrow Airport.
 8 March – Police in Gloucester confirm that they have now found the bodies of eight people buried at 25 Cromwell Street.
 12 March – The first women are ordained as priests in the Church of England, at Bristol Cathedral, the very first being Angela Berners-Wilson.
 19 March – Europe's first inverted roller coaster, Nemesis, opens at Alton Towers.

April
 April – Economic growth for the first quarter of this year exceeded 1% – the highest for five years.
 1 April – Women's Royal Air Force fully merged into Royal Air Force.
 10 April – Human remains are found at Kempley, Gloucestershire, by police working on the Gloucester mass murder case. The body is believed to be that of Catherine "Rena" Costello, Fred West's first wife, who was last seen alive in 1971.
 12 April – Bob Cryer, the Labour MP for Bradford South in West Yorkshire, is accidentally killed after his car overturns on the M1 near Watford, Hertfordshire.
 20 April – Unemployment has fallen to just over 2,500,000 – the lowest level in two years – as the economy continues to make a good recovery from the recession that ended a year ago.
 28 April – Rosemary West, 40-year-old wife of suspected serial killer Fred West, is charged with three of the murders her husband stands accused of. Rosemary West was first arrested seven days ago, two months after her husband was first taken into custody.
 29 April – An opinion poll shows that Conservative support has fallen to 26% – their worst showing in any major opinion poll since coming to power 15 years ago.

May
 4 May – Police find human remains buried at a former home of Fred and Rose West in Gloucester. The body is believed to be that of Fred West's daughter Charmaine, who was last seen alive at the age of 8 in the summer of 1971.
 5 May – Local council elections see the Conservatives lose 429 seats and control of 18 councils.
 9 May – Release of Scottish group Wet Wet Wet's cover of the song "Love Is All Around" (1967), as featured in Four Weddings and a Funeral. From 29 May it will spend 15 consecutive weeks at number one in the UK Singles Chart, the longest spell ever attained by a British act.
 12 May – John Smith (Labour Party leader) dies suddenly of a heart attack in London at 55 years old.
 13 May – The film Four Weddings and a Funeral is released in the UK.
 19 May – Robert Black, who was jailed for life four years ago for abducting a seven-year-old girl in the Scottish Borders, is found guilty of murdering three girls (Caroline Hogg, Susan Maxwell and Sarah Harper) who were killed during the 1980s and sentenced to life imprisonment with a recommended minimum term of 35 years.
 25 May – The Camelot Group consortium wins the contract to run the UK's first National Lottery.
 31 May – Tony Blair and Gordon Brown have dinner at the Granita restaurant in Islington and allegedly make a deal on who will become the leader of the Labour Party, and ultimately, the next Prime Minister of the United Kingdom.

June
 2 June – Chinook crash on Mull of Kintyre: an RAF Chinook helicopter carrying more than twenty leading intelligence experts crashes on the Mull of Kintyre, killing everyone on board.
 7 June
 Television playwright Dennis Potter, 59, dies of cancer in Ross-on-Wye, a week after his wife Margaret died of the same illness.
 Police working on the Gloucester mass murder case find and begin the 2-day recovery of human remains from a field at Much Marcle, near Gloucester (a site located by Fred West), which are identified on 30 June to be those of Anne McFall, who was last seen alive in 1967 at the age of 18 and pregnant with West's child.
 9 June – David Chidgey wins the Eastleigh seat for the Liberal Democrats in the by-election sparked by Stephen Milligan's death; the Tory majority now stands at 15 seats compared with the 21-seat majority they gained at the general election two years ago.
 13 June – The Conservatives suffer their worst election results this century, winning a mere 18 out of 87 of the nation's seats in the European parliament elections. The resurgent Labour Party, still without a leader as the search for a successor to the late John Smith continues, wins 62 seats.
 16 June – Sir Norman Fowler resigns as chairman of the Conservative Party.
 15 June – Britain's railways grind to a virtual standstill with a strike by more than 4,000 signalling staff.
 29 June – Jonathan Dimbleby's film on Charles III, Charles: The Private Man, the Public Role is broadcast on ITV.
 30 June – Magistrates in Gloucester charge Fred West with a total of 11 murders believed to have been committed between 1967 and 1987, while Rose West is charged with nine murders which are believed to have been committed between 1970 and 1987. On 3 July he is charged with a 12th murder, that of Anna McFall.

July
 14 July – The Queen opens the SIS Building, the new headquarters of MI6 on the banks of the River Thames in London.
 21 July – Tony Blair wins the Labour Party leadership election defeating John Prescott and Margaret Beckett.
 26 July – The Embassy of Israel, London is damaged in a bombing.

August
 1 August
 Fire destroys the Norwich Central Library, including most of its historical records.
 The University of London founds the School of Advanced Study, a group of postgraduate research institutes.
 13 August – Fifteen-year-old Richard Everitt is stabbed to death in London by a gang of British Bangladeshis in a racially motivated murder.
 18 August – The first MORI poll since Tony Blair became Labour Party leader gives him a massive boost in his ambition to become prime minister as his party scores at 56% and has a 33-point lead over the Conservatives, who are now just five points ahead of the Liberal Democrats.
 20 August – Huddersfield Town move into their new all-seater Alfred McAlpine Stadium, which has an initial capacity of 16,000 and will rise to 20,000 later this year on the completion of a third stand; a fourth stand is also planned and would take the capacity to around 25,000.
 26 August – Sunday Trading Act 1994 (5 July) comes into full effect, permitting retailers to trade on Sundays, though restricting opening times of larger stores to a maximum of six hours, which must be between 10 am and 6 pm. This will have a significant social effect on shopping habits.
 31 August – The Provisional Irish Republican Army declares a ceasefire.

September
 September – Lidl, a German discount food supermarket chain, opens its first 10 stores in Britain.
 2–4 September – The first Whitby Goth Weekend takes place in Whitby, North Yorkshire, featuring Inkubus Sukkubus, 13 Candles, Nightmoves, All Living Fear.
 30 September – Aldwych, North Weald and Ongar railway stations on the London Underground close permanently after the last trains run.

October
 October – Rover Group launches the Rover 100 – a facelifted version of the Metro.
 10 October – With the economic recovery continuing at a strong rate, unemployment is now falling at twice the rate in Conservative constituencies than in Labour ones, giving the Conservatives hope that they could win the next general election (which has to be held by May 1997) despite Labour having led the way in the opinion polls for virtually all of the two-and-a-half years since the last election.
 20 October – Cash-for-questions affair: The Guardian newspaper reports that two Conservative MPs, Neil Hamilton and Tim Smith, took bribes from Harrods chief Mohamed Al-Fayed to ask questions in the House of Commons.
 30 October – Korean industrial giant Daewoo announces that it will start selling cars in Britain next year, selling directly to customers through its own sales organisation rather than a traditional dealer network.
 31 October – The Duke of Edinburgh attends a ceremony in Israel where his late mother, Princess Alice of Battenberg is honoured as "Righteous among the Nations" for sheltering Jewish families from the Nazis in Athens, during World War II.

November
 3 November – Criminal Justice and Public Order Act receives Royal Assent. This changes the right to silence of an accused person, allowing for inferences to be drawn from their silence; increases police powers of "Stop and search" and gives them greater rights to take and retain intimate body samples; changes the law relating to collective trespass to land, criminalising some previously civil offences; tightens the law in some areas relating to obscenity, pornography and sexual offences; and lowers the age of consent for male homosexual acts from twenty-one years to eighteen, while setting the age for female acts at sixteen, for the first time in English law recognising the existence of lesbianism.
 10 November – BBC1 broadcasts the first episode of sitcom The Vicar of Dibley, created by Richard Curtis for Dawn French, who plays the title role.
 15 November –  The Daily Telegraph becomes the first national newspaper in Britain to launch an online edition, the Electronic Telegraph. Some 600,000 people in Britain now have access to the internet at home.
 16 November – Unemployment has fallen to under 2,500,000 for the first time since the end of 1991.
 19 November – The first UK National Lottery draw takes place.

December
 December – Rover Group ends production of its long-running Maestro and Montego ranges which were strong sellers during the 1980s but in recent years has been produced in lower volumes due to the success of models like the Rover 200.
 9 December – First meeting between the British government and Sinn Féin in more than 70 years.
 14 December – Moors murderer Myra Hindley, who has been in prison since 1966, is informed by the Home Office that she will never be released from prison. She is one of an estimated 15 life sentence prisoners who have been issued with the whole life tariff. The decision was taken by former Home Secretary David Waddington in 1990. Ian Brady who was also jailed with Hindley in May 1966, is also on the list. 
 15 December – Tony Blair continues to enjoy dominance in the opinion polls as the latest MORI poll shows Labour support at an unprecedented 61%, putting them a massive 39 points ahead of the Conservatives. The Liberal Democrats have suffered a slump in popularity, gained just 13% of the vote in this poll compared to 20% a year ago. Ian Pearson wins the Dudley West by-election for Labour with nearly 70% of the votes, becoming the new MP for the constituency which was left vacant with the death of Conservative John Blackburn two months ago. The Conservative majority has now fallen to 13 seats.
 28 December – Tony Blair claims that 40% of the workforce have been unemployed at some time since 1989, although there has never been more than 10.6% of the workforce out of work at the same time since then.

Undated
 Deregulation of the British milk market following the abolition of most functions of the Milk Marketing Board under terms of the Agriculture Act 1993.
 All Saints Church in Dewsbury is raised to the dignity of Dewsbury Minster, the first such modern elevation in the Church of England.

Publications
 Iain M. Banks' novel Feersum Endjinn.
 Edwina Currie's novel A Parliamentary Affair.
 Simon Hopkinson's cookbook Roast Chicken and Other Stories.
 James Kelman's novel How Late It Was, How Late.
 Terry Pratchett's Discworld novels Soul Music and Interesting Times.
 Sexual Behaviour in Britain: the national survey of sexual attitudes and lifestyles by Kaye Wellings et al.

Births
 14 January – Abi Phillips, singer-songwriter and actress
 17 January – Lucy Boynton, actress
 18 January – Sam Strike, actor
 19 January – Alfie Mawson, footballer
 21 January – Laura Robson, Australian-born tennis player
 30 January – Amelia Dimoldenberg, media personality
 1 February – Harry Styles, pop singer-songwriter, member of boyband One Direction
 6 February – Charlie Heaton, actor
 12 February – Reece Topley, cricketer
 22 February – Jake Hill, English racing driver
 24 February – Ryan Fraser, footballer
 7 March – Jordan Pickford, goalkeeper
 10 March – Nikita Parris, footballer
 11 March – Andrew Robertson, footballer
 11 April – Dakota Blue Richards, actress
 19 April – Freya Ridings, singer
 5 May – Celeste, American-born singer
 9 May – Ryan Auger, footballer
 21 May – Tom Daley, diver
 1 June – Ross Greer, Scottish politician
 19 June – Scarlxrd, rapper 
 23 June – Jamie Borthwick, actor
 28 June – Madeline Duggan, actress
 1 July – Fallon Sherrock, darts player
 6 July – Camilla and Rebecca Rosso, twin actresses
 21 July – Jamal Lowe, footballer
 14 August – Maya Jama, television and radio presenter
 10 September – Hetti Bywater, actress
 12 September – Mhairi Black, Scottish politician
 19 September – Alex Etel, English actor
 20 September – Wallis Day, actress 
 21 September – Ben Proud, English swimmer
 24 September – Alex Mellor, rugby league player
 17 October – Ben Duckett, cricketer
 1 November – James Ward-Prowse, footballer
 3 November − Ella Mai, singer 
 6 November − Paul Mullin, footballer 
 9 November – MNEK, singer 
 11 November – Ellie Simmons, paralympic swimmer
 30 November – William Melling, actor
 12 December – Mitchell Pinnock, footballer
 16 December – Olivia Gray, née Grant, actress
 28 December – Adam Peaty, swimmer

Deaths
 5 January – Brian Johnston, BBC cricket commentator (born 1912)
 10 January – Michael Aldridge, actor (born 1920)
 20 January – Sir Matt Busby, football player and manager (born 1909)
 23 January – Brian Redhead, journalist and broadcaster (born 1929)
 7 February
Stephen Milligan, politician (born 1948)
Sir Charles Leslie Richardson, Army general and World War II veteran (born 1908)
 19 February – Derek Jarman, film director, stage designer, artist and writer (born 1942)
 28 February – Ron Leighton, politician (born 1930)
 10 March – Rupert Bruce-Mitford, archaeologist (born 1914)
 15 March – Jack Hargreaves, television presenter and writer (born 1911)
 23 March – Donald Swann, composer (born 1923)
 29 March – Bill Travers, actor and co-founder of the Born Free Foundation (born 1922)
 1 April – Ian MacDonald Campbell, civil engineer (born 1922)
 12 April – Bob Cryer, politician (car accident) (born 1934)
 15 April – John Curry, figure skater (born 1949)
 8 May – Lady Victoria Wemyss, last surviving godchild of Queen Victoria (born 1890)
 12 May – John Smith, Leader of the Labour Party and Leader of the Opposition (born 1938)
 29 May – Lady May Abel Smith, British royalty (born 1906)
 3 June – Stuart Blanch, former archbishop of York (born 1918)
 6 June – Mark McManus, Scottish actor (born 1935)
 7 June – Dennis Potter, screenwriter (born 1935)
 14 June – Denys Hay, historian (born 1915)
 21 July – John Ernest, American constructivist artist (born 1922)
 26 July – Terry Scott, comic actor (born 1927)
 28 July – Bernard Delfont, theatrical impresario (born 1909 in Russia)
 29 July – Dorothy Crowfoot Hodgkin, chemist, Nobel Prize laureate (born 1910)
 11 August – Peter Cushing, actor (born 1913)
 18 August – Richard Laurence Millington Synge, chemist and Nobel Prize winner (born 1914)
 29 August – Marea Hartman, athletics administrator (born 1920)
 2 September – Roy Castle, actor and entertainer (born 1932)
 3 September – Billy Wright, footballer and manager (born 1924)
 11 September – Jessica Tandy, actress (born 1909)
 16 September – Johnny Berry, footballer (born 1926)
 10 October – Richard J. C. Atkinson, archaeologist (born 1920)
 12 October – John Blackburn, politician (born 1933)
 22 October – Harold Hopkins, physicist (born 1918)
 31 October – Sir John Pope-Hennessy, art historian (born 1913)
 11 November – Elizabeth Maconchy, composer (born 1907)
 16 November – Doris Speed, actress (born 1899)
 18 December
Heinz Bernard, actor and theatre manager (born 1923) 
David Pitt, Baron Pitt of Hampstead, politician and physician (born 1913)
 23 December – Sebastian Shaw, actor and writer (born 1905)
 27 December – Fanny Cradock, cookery writer and TV chef (born 1909)

See also
 1994 in British music
 1994 in British television
 List of British films of 1994

References

 
Years of the 20th century in the United Kingdom
United Kingdom